Major-General James Charles Young  (1858–1926) was a British Army officer.

Military career
Young was commissioned into the 35th (Royal Sussex) Regiment of Foot on 11 November 1876. He saw action in the Anglo–Egyptian War in 1882 and the Nile Expedition in 1884. He then became Deputy Assistant Adjutant General in South Africa in 1892 and commanding officer of the 2nd Battalion, the Royal Sussex Regiment in South Africa in 1899 and fought on the Second Boer War. He went on to be Assistant Adjutant General of the 4th (Quetta) Division in 1904, commander of the 7th Ferozepore Brigade in November 1907 and commander of the 4th Rawalpindi Brigade in February 1909.

After that Young became General Officer Commanding Home Counties Division in October 1912. He accompanied his division on its journey, departing from Southampton on 30 October 1914 for India; however on arrival in Bombay on 1 December 1914, he handed over the units and returned to England, arriving on 22 December.  He took command of the 2nd Line 2nd Home Counties Division on 20 January 1915. He then retired in April 1917.

He was colonel of the Royal Sussex Regiment from 1914 to 1926.

References

Sources
 

|-

1858 births
1926 deaths
British Army major generals
Companions of the Order of the Bath
Royal Sussex Regiment officers
British Army generals of World War I
British Army personnel of the Anglo-Egyptian War
British Army personnel of the Second Boer War